Belaynesh Zevadia (born 1967) is an Ethiopian-born Israeli diplomat.  She was appointed Israeli ambassador to Ethiopia in 2012 and was the Israeli ambassador to Rwanda.

Biography
Belaynesh Zevadia was born to a Jewish family in the Gondar region of Ethiopia. She immigrated to Israel in 1984 at the age of 17, during Operation Moses.  She is a graduate of the Hebrew University of Jerusalem.

Diplomatic career
Zevadia was the first immigrant from Ethiopia to enter the Israeli Foreign Service as a trainee, working at Israeli consulate posts in Houston and Chicago. In 2012, she was appointed ambassador to Ethiopia, becoming the first immigrant from Ethiopia to Israel to serve as an Israeli ambassador.   By 2016, she was the Israeli ambassador to Rwanda.

See also
Women of Israel

References 

Ambassadors of Israel to Ethiopia
Israeli people of Ethiopian-Jewish descent
Ethiopian emigrants to Israel
Israeli Jews
Israeli consuls
Israeli women ambassadors
Year of birth missing (living people)
Living people
Beta Israel
Ambassadors of Israel to Rwanda